Hopewell is an unincorporated community in Fulton County, Georgia, United States. It lies at an elevation of 1122 feet (342 m).

The community was so named on account of first settlers' optimistic spirit.

References

Unincorporated communities in Fulton County, Georgia
Unincorporated communities in Georgia (U.S. state)